Echo or The Echo may refer to the following newspapers:

 The Echo (Cork newspaper), formerly the Evening Echo, founded in 1892 in Cork, Ireland
 The Echo (Dublin newspaper), based in Dublin, Ireland
 The Echo (London), a London newspaper published 1868–1905
 The Echo (Essex), an evening newspaper which serves South Essex
 L'Echo,  a French-language financial newspaper published in Belgium
 L'Écho de Paris, a daily newspaper in Paris from 1884 to 1944
 The Blue Mountain Echo, published from 1909 to 1928 in Katoomba, New South Wales, Australia
 Byron Shire Echo, based in Byron Bay, New South Wales, Australia
 Cavan Echo, based in Cavan Town, County Cavan, Ireland
 Dorset Echo, serving the county of Dorset, England
 Enniscorthy Echo, based in Enniscorthy, County Wexford, Ireland
 Gloucestershire Echo, based in Cheltenham, England
 Kimberley Echo, a community newspaper based in Kununurra, Kimberley, Western Australia
 Lincolnshire Echo, based in Lincolnshire, England
 Liverpool Echo, based in Liverpool, England
 Loughborough Echo, based in Loughborough, Leicestershire, England
 Mayo Echo, a controversial free, weekly tabloid newspaper circulated in County Mayo, Ireland, during the 2000s
 The Northern Echo, based in Darlington, England
 The Sofia Echo, Bulgaria's national English-language newspaper
 South Wales Echo, based in Cardiff, Wales
 Echo Weekly, an alternative weekly newspaper based in Kitchener, Ontario
 Bournemouth Daily Echo, based in Bournemouth, England
 The Irish Echo, based in New York City
 Southern Daily Echo, based in Hampshire, England
 Echo (Azerbaijani newspaper)

See also
 Express & Echo'', serving Exeter, England, and the surrounding area